Iliya Markov (May 28, 1805 – April 17, 1898), known as Ilyo Voyvoda or Dedo Iljo Maleshevski, was a Bulgarian revolutionary from the region of Macedonia, who is considered a national hero in both Bulgaria and North Macedonia. He was the father-in-law of revolutionary Dimitar Popgeorgiev (1840-1907).

Early life

Iliya was born in the city of Berovo, at the time part of the Rumelia Eyalet of the Ottoman Empire (in modern eastern North Macedonia), into a poor farmer family. The birthdate is given as 28 May, while the birthyear is unclear; early literature place it at 1805, while Vasil D. Stoyanov said that Ilyo was 45 years of age in 1867 (thus born in 1822). Historian Jovan Hadži-Vasiljević (1866–1946) said that Ilyo was at most 50 years of age in 1865 (thus born in, or after, 1815). His father was named Marko Popgeorgiev (Марко Попгеоргиев/Поп-Георгиев, hence Markov). Ilyo was a prominent Hajduk voyvoda (commander) of cheta's (armed bands) in Maleshevo, Rila and Pirin. Later he worked as a keeper in the Rila monastery. In 1859 he moved to Belgrade. In 1861 he joined the Bulgarian Legion, headquartered in Belgrade, and took part in the Serbian-Turkish War (1876–77) and Russo-Turkish War (1877–78).

Liberation of Bulgaria
Ilyo used every chance to make a contribution in any war against the Ottoman Empire. During the Russo-Turkish War of 1877–1878 he operated with a band near Lovech. His band joined the Western divisions of general Joseph Vladimirovich Gourko and participated in the liberation of Sofia, Radomir and Kyustendil. Illyo was one of the Bulgarian representatives at the signing of the Treaty of San Stefano which marked the restoration of Bulgaria in its ethnic borders. It was there he was awarded a medal for bravery.

Post-Liberation activity
The joy from the liberation was short-lived though, as the Treaty of Berlin (1878) soon partitioned the newly liberated country. Bulgaria was divided into three parts: the Principality of Bulgaria, the autonomous province of Eastern Rumelia and Macedonia given back to the Ottomans. The discontent among the people erupted in the Kresna-Razlog Uprising (1878–1879) in which Illyo took active participation. Illyo Voivoda and his band took part in Serbo-Bulgarian War despite the advancing age of the leader. As part of the Radomir squad they participated in the battles of Breznik, Slivnitsa and Vranje among others.

Legacy

He fought in battles all his life, and died from old age at the end of the 19th century in Kyustendil. He is a near-mythical figure of the region and has been the subject of many folk songs. Some of his personal belongings are kept in the monastery of St. Archangel Michael which serves as the city museum of Berovo. The house in which Ilyo Voyvoda lived from 1878 to his death in 1898 in Kyustendil survived long enough to be renovated in 1979-1980 and has served as a museum, dedicated to Ilyo Voyvoda and the people's fight for freedom in Kyustendil since 1981. Ilyo Voyvoda's grave is also located in Kyustendil.

Honours
Ilyo Point on Clarence Island, Antarctica is named after the Ilyo Voyvoda.

References

External links 
Death certificate of Ilyo Voyvoda 
29 January 1878  The liberation of the town of Kyustendil

1805 births
1898 deaths
People from Berovo
Bulgarian revolutionaries
Bulgarian people of the Russo-Turkish War (1877–1878)
People of the Serbo-Bulgarian War
19th-century Bulgarian people
Macedonia under the Ottoman Empire
Macedonian Bulgarians